Seán Keane (born 24 August 1961) is an Irish singer and musician, known for his distinctive sean-nós-style voice.

Background
Seán Keane was born in a small village called Caherlistrane near Tuam in County Galway into a musical family, including his sister Dolores. He took a first prize in the Connacht Fleadh for singing in English.

Career
Together with Frances Black and others he was a founder member of the group Arcady. He was voted Performer of the Year by readers of Irish Music Magazine in 1997/1998 and 1998/1999, and called "the greatest Irish musical find of the `90's" (London Independent), and "the fastest rising star of the Irish music scene" (Irish Times). His musical voice is unique, and his songs encompass a mixture of traditional Irish folk music, pop, blues, and country. Seán Keane has released eleven solo albums and collaborated on five others.

Discography 
All Heart No Roses - 1994
Turn A Phrase - 1996
No Stranger - 1998
The Man That I Am - 2000
Seansongs - 2002
Portrait - The Best Of Sean Keane - 2003
You Got Gold - 2006
An Irish Scattering - 2008
Valley Of The Heart - 2009
Never Alone - 2013
Christmas by the hearth - 2014
New Day Dawning - 2016
Gratitude - 2018 (with the RTÉ Concert Orchestra)

DVDs
The Irish Scattering - 2008
Sean Keane Live - 2016

References

External links
Official Website

1961 births
20th-century Irish male singers
Living people
Musicians from County Galway
People from Galway (city)
Sean-nós singers